Christopher Dotterweich (March 24, 1896 – November 20, 1969) was an American cyclist. He competed in two events at the 1920 Summer Olympics.

References

External links
 

1896 births
1969 deaths
American male cyclists
Olympic cyclists of the United States
Cyclists at the 1920 Summer Olympics
Sportspeople from Newark, New Jersey